Triathlon competitions at the 2023 Pan American Games in Santiago, Chile are scheduled to be held between November 2 and 4, 2023 at El Sol Beach.

Three medal events will be contested, one individual per gender and one mixed relay. A total of 72 triathletes will compete in the Games.

Qualification

A total of 72 triathletes (36 per gender) will qualify to compete. A nation may enter a maximum of 6 triathletes (three per gender), with the exception of the winners of the 2021 Junior Pan American Games. The host nation (Chile) automatically qualified four athletes (two per gender). All other nations will qualify through various qualifying tournaments and rankings. A maximum five nations could enter the maximum of 3 triathletes per gender.

Medal summary

Medalists

See also
Triathlon at the 2024 Summer Olympics

References

Events at the 2023 Pan American Games
2023
Pan American Games